William Gisentaner (December 11, 1899 – death date unknown) was an American baseball pitcher in the Negro leagues. He played from 1920 to 1937 with several teams, including the Homestead Grays, Kansas City Monarchs and the Lincoln Giants. He pitched with a mangled left hand.

References

External links
 and Baseball-Reference Black Baseball stats and Seamheads

1899 births
Year of death unknown
Lincoln Giants players
Homestead Grays players
Atlanta Black Crackers players
Chicago American Giants players
Louisville White Sox players
Newark Stars players
Baltimore Black Sox players
Brooklyn Royal Giants players
Columbus Buckeyes (Negro leagues) players
Kansas City Monarchs players
Baseball players from Alabama
Baseball pitchers